{{DISPLAYTITLE:C2H5ClO}}
The molecular formula C2H5ClO (molar mass: 80.51 g/mol, exact mass: 80.0029 u) may refer to:

 1-Chloroethanol
 2-Chloroethanol
 Chloromethyl methyl ether (CMME)
 Ethyl hypochlorite